TuS Nettelstedt-Lübbecke  is a handball club from Lübbecke, Germany, that plays in the Handball-Bundesliga.

Accomplishments
2. Handball-Bundesliga: 5
 : 1994, 2002, 2004, 2009, 2017
 DHB-Pokal:
 : 1981
 EHF Cup Winner's Cup:
 : 1981
 EHF Challenge Cup:
 : 1997, 1998
 European Club Championship:
 : 1981

Team

Current squad
Squad for the 2021–22 season

Goalkeepers
 1  Håvard Åsheim
 16  Aljoša Rezar
Left Wingers
 45  Jan-Eric Speckmann
 52  Tom Skroblien
Right Wingers 
 14  Peter Strosack
 15  Marvin Mundus 
Line players
 19  Yannick Dräger
 20  Tin Kontrec
 48  Leoš Petrovský 

Left Backs
5  Lutz Heiny
 23  Valentin Spohn
 28  Marek Nissen
Central Backs
 10  Tom Wolf
 11  Benas Petreikis
 22  Luka Mrakovčić
Right Backs
3  Rennosuke Tokuda
7  Florian Baumgärtner
9  Dominik Ebner

Transfers
Transfers for the 2022–23 season

Joining
  Rutger ten Velde (LW) (from  TuS Ferndorf)

Leaving

References

External links

German handball clubs
Handball-Bundesliga
Lübbecke